Tillman County is a county located in the southwestern part of Oklahoma, United States. As of the 2010 census, the population was 7,992. The county seat is Frederick.

History
The Medicine Lodge Treaty of 1867 established a reservation in the southwestern part of Indian Territory for the Kiowa, Apache and Comanche tribes. The Jerome Commission started enrolling members of these tribes in 1892, a prerequisite to opening "excess" land for settlement by non-Indians. The first lottery was held on August 6, 1901. It was followed in 1906 by the "Big Pasture" Lottery.

The county was founded at the time of Oklahoma statehood in 1907, and was named for Senator Benjamin Tillman of South Carolina.  It had previously been part of Comanche County, Oklahoma Territory.  Frederick was designated as the county seat at the time of statehood. In 1910 and 1924 portions of Kiowa County were added to the north side of the county.

Geography
It is located along the Texas border.

Adjacent counties
 Kiowa County (north)
 Comanche County (northeast)
 Cotton County (east)
 Wichita County, Texas (south)
 Wilbarger County, Texas (southwest)
 Jackson County (northwest)

Demographics

As of the 2010 United States Census, there were 7,992 people, 3,216 households, and 2,136 families residing in the county.  The population density was 3.5/km2 (9.1/mi2).  There were 4,077 housing units at an average density of 1.8/km2 (4.6/mi2).  The racial makeup of the county was 73.5% white, 7.7% Black or African American, 3.4% Native American, 0.3% Asian, less than 0.1% Pacific Islander, 11% from other races, and 4.1% from two or more races.  Just over 23% of the population was Hispanic or Latino.

There were 3,216 households, out of which 31.5% included children under the age of 18, 48.8% were married couples living together, 12.3% had a female householder with no husband present, 5.3% had a male householder with no wife present, and 33.6% were non-families.  Individuals living alone accounted for 30.3% of households and individuals age 65 years or older living alone accounted for 14%.  The average household size was 2.4 and the average family size was 3.96.

In the county, the population was spread out, with 24.7% under the age of 18, 7.8% from 18 to 24, 22.5% from 25 to 44, 27.3% from 45 to 64, and 17.7% who were 65 years of age or older.  The median age was 40.9 years. For every 100 females there were 99.8 males.  For every 100 females age 18 and over, there were 99.6 males.

The median income for a household in the county was $31,437, and the median income for a family was $40,616.  Males had a median income of $32,885 versus $29,757 for females.  The per capita income for the county was $16,541.  Sixteen percent of families and 21.7% of the population were below the poverty line, including 30.5% of those under age 18 and 12.1% of those age 65 or over.

Economy
Since statehood, Tillman County's economy has depended mainly on agriculture, including the raising of livestock. The main farm crops are cotton, corn, wheat, oats, sorghum and milo (a variety of commercial sorghum).

Cattle ranching became prominent during the 1880s, when prominent Texas ranchers (principally Daniel and William Thomas Waggoner and Samuel Burk Burnett) leased grazing land from the Kiowa, Comanche, and Apache tribes.

The U.S. military established Frederick Army Air Field in 1941 to train crews to fly Cessna UC-78 Bobcats and North American B-25 Mitchells. After the war, the former base became a civilian airfield and is now known as Frederick Regional Airport.

Politics

Communities

 Davidson
 Frederick (county seat)
 Grandfield
 Hollister
 Loveland
 Manitou
 Tipton

See also
 National Register of Historic Places listings in Tillman County, Oklahoma

References

External links
  Tillman County Website
 Lyrics to 'Tillman County' by Dave Carter and Tracy Grammer
 Oklahoma Digital Maps: Digital Collections of Oklahoma and Indian Territory

 
1907 establishments in Oklahoma
Populated places established in 1907
Benjamin Tillman